Club Deportivo Universidad César Vallejo is a Peruvian football club located in Trujillo. The club was founded on January 6, 1996 and was promoted in 2003, through the Copa Perú, to the Peruvian First Division and relegated in 2005. In 2007, they were Segunda División champions and were promoted to the first division again.

History
The club was founded on January 6, 1996 representing Cesar Vallejo University and first participated in the championship of the third division of Trujillo at the end of 1996 and the team managed to crown champion of the tournament in 1997. In the year 1998, champion of the second division was crowned of Trujillo and won the privilege to participate, at the age of two years since foundation. Vallejo participated for the first time in the tournament of first division in the year 1999. They did quite well and even occupied the third position of the tournament. In its second year in first division, Vallejo had the respect of the large teams of the city was won of Trujillo, like the Carlos A. Mannucci, Deportivo UPAO, Alfonso Ugarte de Chiclín, among others. To surprise of many came, they fight the title with the Deportivo UPAO and achieved the subchampionship.

In its campaign 2001 came be Departamental, Provincial, and Local champion. In the regional phase of the Copa Perú, was faced to the traditional UTC and José Gálvez of Chimbote to whom was defeated. Then, in the encounters by the national phase left on the road to the Atlético Grau and in the great end the Poets fell for penalties and Coronel Bolognesi went on to win the Peru Cup.

The following year would repeat a great campaign but on the national phase Atlético Grau would leave it on the road. In the 2003 it achieved the desired title and its income increased after facing to worthy rival of different regions of the country and to conquer in the great end to the Deportivo Educación of Abancay in the National Stadium.

The club struggled during the 2004 and 2005 seasons in the first division and was relegated to 2nd division. During the 2007 season, the club participate in the Second Division of the Peruvian soccer, in which it obtained promotion back to top division, after participating against teams as Universidad San Marcos, Hijos de Acosvinchos, UTC and Atlético Minero. In November 2012 the club qualified for the edition 2013 of the Copa Libertadores where they were eliminated in the preliminary round. During the 2013 season it qualified to the 2014 Copa Sudamericana after finishing 5th.

On 27 April 2015, they won the 2015 Torneo del Inca as they beat Alianza Lima 1–3 with goals of Mauricio Montes, Víctor Cedrón and Daniel Chávez. This is Universidad César Vallejo first major title.

Colours and badge
The club's colors are blue, white and red just as the university's colours. Since its promotion to the first division, the club has used three badges. The first badge had the club's initials with the university's name along the oval-shaped outline and lasted until 2009. The second badge only modified the center of the badge by adding a book next to the initials of the club and was first used in 2010. The third badge was a complete change, taking the shape of shield with the red claws of a griffin placed on the top. The significance of the griffin is due to the city of Trujillo coat of arms displaying one. Moreover, the badge employed by the football club displays the team name as Universidad César Vallejo Club de Fútbol to distinguish it from the club's other sports teams.

Honours

National

League
Peruvian Segunda División:
Winners (2): 2007, 2018
Runner-up (1): 2017

Copa Perú:
Winners (1): 2003
Runner-up (1): 2001

National cups
Torneo del Inca: 
Winners (1): 2015

Regional
Región II:
Winners (3): 2001, 2002, 2003

Liga Departamental de La Libertad:
Winners (3): 2001, 2002, 2003

Liga Provincial de Trujillo:
Winners (1): 2001

Liga Distrital de Trujillo:
Winners (1): 2001

Friendly International
Copa Sebastián Abreu:
Winners (1): 2023
Copa Jorge Bava:
Winners (1): 2023
Copa Ciudad de Trujillo: 
Winners (1): 2011

Under-20 team
Torneo de Promoción y Reserva: 
Winners (1): 2010

Performance in CONMEBOL competitions

A = appearances, P = matches played, W = won, D = drawn, L = lost, GF = goals for, GA = goals against, DG = difference goals, Pts = points.

Current squad

Notable players

Managers

See also
List of football clubs in Peru
Peruvian football league system

References

External links
Official website

Association football clubs established in 1996
Football clubs in Trujillo, Peru
University and college association football clubs